Xulihu Chanyu (r. 102-101 BC) was a ruler of the Xiongnu Empire. Xulihu Chanyu was the younger brother of Wuwei Chanyu. He succeeded his nephew Er Chanyu in 102 BC.

In 101 BC, the Xiongnu raided Dingxiang, Yunzhong, Zhangye, and Jiuquan.

Xulihu died in 101 BC and was succeeded by his younger brother Chedihou Chanyu.

Footnotes

References
Bichurin N.Ya., "Collection of information on peoples in Central Asia in ancient times", vol. 1, Sankt Petersburg, 1851, reprint Moscow-Leningrad, 1950 (Shiji ch. 110, Qian Han Shu ch. 94a) 

Chanyus
2nd-century BC rulers in Asia
100 BC deaths